Yokoyama Station may refer to either of the following train stations in Japan:

 Yokoyama Station (Hyōgo) of Kobe Electric Railway
 Yokoyama Station (Ishikawa) of JR West
 Shima-Yokoyama Station of Kintetsu
 Rikuzen-Yokoyama Station of JR East